Iman, Imann, Imaan, Eman, Emaan, or Imman may refer to:

Places 
 Iman, Iran, a village in Kalashi District, Kermanshah Province
 The Iman River, the former name of the Bolshaya Ussurka River, a tributary of the Ussuri River in Russia's Primorsky Krai
 Iman, the former name of Dalnerechensk, a city in Russia's Primorsky Krai

Other uses 
 Iman people, an ethnic group of Australia
 Iman language, a language of Australia
 Iman (Islam), Islamic faith of a believer in Islam
 Inner-City Muslim Action Network, a Muslim charity organization based in Chicago, Illinois
 I-Man, a 1986 science-fiction television movie produced by Disney

People with the name 
 Iman (given name)
 Iman (surname)
 Iman (model) (born 1955), a Somali fashion model, actress and entrepreneur
 Iman (singer) (born 1980), American singer-songwriter

See also
 Imam (disambiguation)
 Imani (disambiguation)
 Yiman (disambiguation)
 Amin (disambiguation)
 Amina (disambiguation)

Language and nationality disambiguation pages